The 2009 World Junior Wrestling Championships were the 33rd edition of the World Junior Wrestling Championships and were held in Ankara, Turkey between 3–9 August 2009.

Medal table

Medal summary

Men's freestyle

Greco-Roman

Women's freestyle

References

External links 
 Database

World Junior Championships
Wrestling Championships
International wrestling competitions hosted by Turkey
Sport in Turkey
World Junior Wrestling Championships
Sports competitions in Ankara